Nassarius micans is a species of sea snail, a marine gastropod mollusc in the family Nassariidae, the Nassa mud snails or dog whelks.

Description
The length of the shell varies between 18 mm and 24 mm.

Distribution
This marine species occurs in the Red Sea and off the Philippines and Indonesia.

References

 Vine, P. (1986). Red Sea Invertebrates. Immel Publishing, London. 224 pp.
 Cernohorsky W. O. (1984). Systematics of the family Nassariidae (Mollusca: Gastropoda). Bulletin of the Auckland Institute and Museum 14: 1–356.

External links
 

Nassariidae
Gastropods described in 1852